Richard John Bauckham  (born 22 September 1946) is an English Anglican scholar in theology, historical theology and New Testament studies, specialising in New Testament Christology and the Gospel of John. He is a senior scholar at Ridley Hall, Cambridge.

Bauckham is a prolific author of books and journal articles.  In 2006, Bauckham published his most widely-read work Jesus and the Eyewitnesses, a book that defends the historical reliability of the gospels.  Bauckham argues that the synoptic gospels are based "quite closely" on the testimony of eyewitnesses, and the Gospel of John is written by an eyewitness.  This is against the belief of some that the four gospels were written later and not via interviews with direct eyewitnesses, but were rather the result of a longer chain of transmission of stories of Jesus filtered through early Christian communities over time.  This longer chain of transmission theory has gained traction in recent years due, in part, to its sensational nature. The theory has also gained traction since the late 1800s when German scholars began ignoring the Jewish Scriptures due to increased antisemitism. Many scholars have attempted to rectify this problem following World War II. In contrast, Bauckham’s theory is considered to be more in line with biblical scholarship that includes the Jewish Scriptures. The book was well-received, earning the 2007 Christianity Today book award in biblical studies and the Michael Ramsey Prize in 2009.  Bauckham updated and expanded the book to respond to critics in a second edition, published in 2017.

Life and career
Bauckham was born in London and studied at the University of Cambridge, where he read history at Clare College (1966–72) and was a fellow of St John's College (1972–75). He taught theology for one year at the University of Leeds and for fifteen years at the University of Manchester from 1977–1992.  At Manchester, he was the Lecturer in the History of Christian Thought.  Bauckham moved to the University of St Andrews in 1992 to be a Professor of New Testament Studies and the named professorship of Bishop Wardlaw Professor. He retired in 2007 in order to concentrate on research and writing.

He is a fellow of the British Academy and a Fellow of the Royal Society of Edinburgh.  Bauckham is a senior scholar at Ridley Hall in Cambridge, and a visiting professor at St Mellitus College in London.

Research and teaching areas
Bauckham has been published in a variety of fields in New Testament studies and early Christianity. He has also published on the theology of the German theologian Jürgen Moltmann. His current research interests include Jesus and the Gospels, New Testament Christology, and the relevance of the Bible to ecological issues.

He gave the Sarum Lectures for 2006 on "Beyond Stewardship: The Bible and the Community of Creation". He also gave a series of the Scottish Journal of Theology Lectures in Aberdeen on "The Gospels as History: Comparisons with Ancient and Modern Historiography".

Honours
 Christianity Today Book Award in Biblical Studies (2007) for Jesus and the Eyewitnesses: The Gospels as Eyewitness Testimony.
 Burkitt Medal (2008) in recognition of special service to Biblical Studies.
 Michael Ramsey Prize (2009) for Jesus and the Eyewitnesses : The Gospels as Eyewitness Testimony.
 Franz-Delitzsch-Award (2010) for The Jewish World around the New Testament.

Works

Books

Chapters

Journal articles

Festschrift

References

External links
 Personal website of Richard Bauckham
 Profile at Ridley Hall, Cambridge
 Richard Bauckham (Theopedia)

1946 births
New Testament scholars
Living people
British biblical scholars
20th-century English theologians
21st-century English theologians
English Anglican theologians
Academics of the Victoria University of Manchester
Academics of the University of St Andrews
Alumni of Clare College, Cambridge
Fellows of the British Academy
Fellows of the Royal Society of Edinburgh
Fellows of St John's College, Cambridge
Academics of the University of Leeds
Anglican biblical scholars
20th-century Anglican theologians
21st-century Anglican theologians
20th-century Christian biblical scholars
21st-century Christian biblical scholars